The 2018 Chicago Marathon was the 41st edition of the annual Chicago Marathon that was held in Chicago, Illinois, United States on October 7, 2018. The men's race was won by Britain's Mo Farah, and the women's race was won by Kenya's Brigid Kosgei.

Summary 
Mo Farah won the 2018 Chicago Marathon with a record time for a European runner of 2:05:11; this was the eighth-fastest Chicago Marathon time. Mosinet Geremew of Ethiopia finished second with a time of 2:05:24. Suguru Osako finished third, setting a Japanese record with a time of 2:05:50.

Brigid Kosgei won the women's race with a personal-best time. 
Daniel Romanchuk won the men's wheelchair race and Manuela Schär claimed the women's equivalent.

Results
The results were as follows.

Men

Women

Wheelchair men

Wheelchair women

References

External links
 https://www.chicagomarathon.com/

2018
Chicago Marathon
Chicago Marathon
Chicago
2010s in Chicago
Marathon
Chicago Marathon